FCSS may refer to:

Fidelity China Special Situations, LSE stock symbol FCSS
Fuchun Secondary School, a secondary school in Woodlands, Singapore